Vorontsovskaya is a metro station on Bolshaya Koltsevaya line of the Moscow Metro, between Novatorskaya and Zyuzino. The name of the station derives from Vorontsovsky Park. The station was opened on 7 December 2021 as part of the section between Mnyovniki and Kakhovskaya.

The station is located close to Kaluzhskaya station, and interchange is in operation.

References

Moscow Metro stations
Railway stations in Russia opened in 2021
Bolshaya Koltsevaya line
Railway stations located underground in Russia